Price Hill is an unincorporated community and coal town in Fayette and Raleigh counties, West Virginia, United States.   Located on the outskirts of Mount Hope along the banks of Dunloup Creek, it was built in the 1890s by the McKell Coal & Coke Company as a company town.  Until the 1980s, the large Siltex Mine operated nearby.

References

Unincorporated communities in West Virginia
Unincorporated communities in Fayette County, West Virginia
Unincorporated communities in Raleigh County, West Virginia
Coal towns in West Virginia